{{DISPLAYTITLE:C20H24O2}}
The molecular formula C20H24O2 (molar mass: 296.40 g/mol, exact mass: 296.1776 u) may refer to:

 Dimestrol, or dianisylhexene
 Ethinylestradiol (EE) 
 Exemestane

Molecular formulas